Monoclonal antibody therapy is a form of immunotherapy that uses monoclonal antibodies (mAbs) to bind monospecifically to certain cells or proteins. The objective is that this treatment will stimulate the patient's immune system to attack those cells. Alternatively, in radioimmunotherapy a radioactive dose localizes a target cell line, delivering lethal chemical doses. Antibodies have been used to bind to molecules involved in T-cell regulation to remove inhibitory pathways that block T-cell responses. This is known as immune checkpoint therapy.

It is possible to create a mAb that is specific to almost any extracellular/cell surface target. Research and development is underway to create antibodies for diseases (such as rheumatoid arthritis, multiple sclerosis, Alzheimer's disease, Ebola and different types of cancers).

Antibody structure and function

Immunoglobulin G (IgG) antibodies are large heterodimeric molecules, approximately 150 kDa and are composed of two kinds of polypeptide chain, called the heavy (~50kDa) and the light chain (~25kDa). The two types of light chains are kappa (κ) and lambda (λ). By cleavage with enzyme papain, the Fab (fragment-antigen binding) part can be separated from the Fc (fragment crystallizable region) part of the molecule. The Fab fragments contain the variable domains, which consist of three antibody hypervariable amino acid domains responsible for the antibody specificity embedded into constant regions. The four known IgG subclasses are involved in antibody-dependent cellular cytotoxicity.
Antibodies are a key component of the adaptive immune response, playing a central role in both in the recognition of foreign antigens and the stimulation of an immune response to them. The advent of monoclonal antibody technology has made it possible to raise antibodies against specific antigens presented on the surfaces of tumors. Monoclonal antibodies can be acquired in the immune system via passive immunity or active immunity. The advantage of active monoclonal antibody therapy is the fact that the immune system will produce antibodies long-term, with only a short-term drug administration to induce this response. However, the immune response to certain antigens may be inadequate, especially in the elderly. Additionally, adverse reactions from these antibodies may occur because of long-lasting response to antigens. Passive monoclonal antibody therapy can ensure consistent antibody concentration, and can control for adverse reactions by stopping administration. However, the repeated administration and consequent higher cost for this therapy are major disadvantages.

Monoclonal antibody therapy may prove to be beneficial for cancer, autoimmune diseases, and neurological disorders that result in the degeneration of body cells, such as Alzheimer's disease. Monoclonal antibody therapy can aid the immune system because the innate immune system responds to the environmental factors it encounters by discriminating against foreign cells from cells of the body. Therefore, tumor cells that are proliferating at high rates, or body cells that are dying which subsequently cause physiological problems are generally not specifically targeted by the immune system, since tumor cells are the patient's own cells. Tumor cells, however are highly abnormal, and many display unusual antigens. Some such tumor antigens are inappropriate for the cell type or its environment. Monoclonal antibodies can target tumor cells or abnormal cells in the body that are recognized as body cells, but are debilitating to one's health.

History

Immunotherapy developed in the 1970s following the discovery of the structure of antibodies and the development of hybridoma technology, which provided the first reliable source of monoclonal antibodies. These advances allowed for the specific targeting of tumors both in vitro and in vivo. Initial research on malignant neoplasms found mAb therapy of limited and generally short-lived success with blood malignancies. Treatment also had to be tailored to each individual patient, which was impracticable in routine clinical settings.

Four major antibody types that have been developed are murine, chimeric, humanised and human. Antibodies of each type are distinguished by suffixes on their name.

Murine 
Initial therapeutic antibodies were murine analogues (suffix -omab). These antibodies have: a short half-life in vivo (due to immune complex formation), limited penetration into tumour sites and inadequately recruit host effector functions. Chimeric and humanized antibodies have generally replaced them in therapeutic antibody applications. Understanding of proteomics has proven essential in identifying novel tumour targets.

Initially, murine antibodies were obtained by hybridoma technology, for which Jerne, Köhler and Milstein received a Nobel prize. However the dissimilarity between murine and human immune systems led to the clinical failure of these antibodies, except in some specific circumstances. Major problems associated with murine antibodies included reduced stimulation of cytotoxicity and the formation of complexes after repeated administration, which resulted in mild allergic reactions and sometimes anaphylactic shock. Hybridoma technology has been replaced by recombinant DNA technology, transgenic mice and phage display.

Chimeric and humanized 
To reduce murine antibody immunogenicity (attacks by the immune system against the antibody), murine molecules were engineered to remove immunogenic content and to increase immunologic efficiency. This was initially achieved by the production of chimeric (suffix -ximab) and humanized antibodies (suffix -zumab). Chimeric antibodies are composed of murine variable regions fused onto human constant regions. Taking human gene sequences from the kappa light chain and the IgG1 heavy chain results in antibodies that are approximately 65% human. This reduces immunogenicity, and thus increases serum half-life.

Humanised antibodies are produced by grafting murine hypervariable regions on amino acid domains into human antibodies. This results in a molecule of approximately 95% human origin. Humanised antibodies bind antigen much more weakly than the parent murine monoclonal antibody, with reported decreases in affinity of up to several hundredfold. Increases in antibody-antigen binding strength have been achieved by introducing mutations into the complementarity determining regions (CDR), using techniques such as chain-shuffling, randomization of complementarity-determining regions and antibodies with mutations within the variable regions induced by error-prone PCR, E. coli mutator strains and site-specific mutagenesis.

Human monoclonal antibodies 
Human monoclonal antibodies (suffix -umab) are produced using transgenic mice or phage display libraries by transferring human immunoglobulin genes into the murine genome and vaccinating the transgenic mouse against the desired antigen, leading to the production of appropriate monoclonal antibodies. Murine antibodies in vitro are thereby transformed into fully human antibodies.

The heavy and light chains of human IgG proteins are expressed in structural polymorphic (allotypic) forms. Human IgG allotype is one of the many factors that can contribute to immunogenicity.

Targeted conditions

Cancer
Anti-cancer monoclonal antibodies can be targeted against malignant cells by several mechanisms. Ramucirumab is a recombinant human monoclonal antibody and is used in the treatment of advanced malignancies. In childhood lymphoma, phase I and II studies have found a positive effect of using antibody therapy.

In January 2023, the FDA approved the EBC-129 to progress into first-in-human studies. It is the first combination of an anticancer drug and a monoclonal antibody specialized in recognizing cancer cells.

Monoclonal antibodies used to boost an anticancer immune response is another strategy to fight cancer where cancer cells are not targeted directly. Strategies include antibodies engineered to block mechanisms which downregulate anticancer immune responses, checkpoints such as PD-1 and CTLA-4, and antibodies modified to stimulate activation of immune cells.

Autoimmune diseases
Monoclonal antibodies used for autoimmune diseases include infliximab and adalimumab, which are effective in rheumatoid arthritis, Crohn's disease and ulcerative colitis by their ability to bind to and inhibit TNF-α. Basiliximab and daclizumab inhibit IL-2 on activated T cells and thereby help preventing acute rejection of kidney transplants. Omalizumab inhibits human immunoglobulin E (IgE) and is useful in moderate-to-severe allergic asthma.

Alzheimer's disease
Alzheimer's disease (AD) is a multi-faceted, age-dependent, progressive neurodegenerative disorder, and is a major cause of dementia. According to the Amyloid hypothesis, the accumulation of extracellular amyloid betapeptides (Aβ) into plaques via oligomerization leads to hallmark symptomatic conditions of AD through synaptic dysfunction and neurodegeneration. Immunotherapy via exogenous monoclonal antibody (mAb) administration has been known to treat various central nervous disorders, such as AD, by inhibiting Aβ-oligomerization thereby preventing neurotoxicity. However, mAbs are large for passive protein channels and are therefore inefficient due to the blood–brain barrier preventing mAb passage into the brain. However, the Peripheral Sink hypothesis proposes a mechanism where mAbs may not need to cross the blood–brain barrier. Therefore, many research studies are being conducted from failed attempts to treat AD in the past.

However, anti-Aβ vaccines can promote antibody-mediated clearance of Aβ plaques in transgenic mice models with amyloid precursor proteins (APP), and can reduce cognitive impairments. Vaccines can stimulate the immune system to produce its own antibodies, in this case by introducing Aβ into transgenic animal models, known as active immunization. They can also introduce antibodies into animal models, known as passive immunization. In mice expressing APP, both active and passive immunization of anti-Aβ antibodies has been shown to be effective in clearing plaques, and can improve cognitive function. Currently, there are no approved monoclonal antibody therapies for Alzheimer's disease, but several clinical trials using passive and active immunization approaches by development of certain drugs approved by the FDA are currently underway, and are expected to yield results in a couple of years. The implementation of these drugs is during the onset of AD. Other research and drug development for early intervention and AD prevention is ongoing. Various drugs that are under research to treat AD include Bapineuzumab, Solanezumab, Gautenerumab, and BAN2401.

Bapineuzumab
Bapineuzumab, a humanized anti-Aβ mAb, is directed against the N-terminus of Aβ. Phase II clinical trials of Bapineuzumab in mild to moderate AD patients resulted in reduced Aβ concentration in the brain. However, in patients with increased apolipoprotein (APOE) e4 carriers, Bapineuzumab treatment is also accompanied by vasogenic edema, a cytotoxic condition where the blood brain barrier has been disrupted thereby affecting white matter from excess accumulation of fluid from capillaries in intracellular and extracellular spaces of the brain.
In Phase III clinical trials, Bapineuzumab treatment is associated with reduced rate of accumulation of Aβ in the brain in APOE e4 patients, and no significant reduction of Aβ concentration in APOE e4 patients and non-APOE e4 patients. Therefore, Aβ plaque concentration was not reduced, and there is no significant clinical benefits in cognitive functioning. Bapineuzumab was discontinued after failing in Phase III clinical trial.

Solanezumab
Solanezumab, an anti-Aβ mAb, targets the N-terminus of Aβ. In Phase I and Phase II of clinical trials, Solanezumab treatment resulted in cerebrospinal fluid elevation of Aβ, thereby showing a reduced concentration of Aβ plaques. Additionally, there are no associated adverse side effects. Phase III clinical trials of Solanezumab brought about significant reduction in cognitive impairment in patients with mild AD, but not in patients with severe AD. However, Aβ concentration did not significantly change, along with other AD biomarkers, including phospho-tau expression, and hippocampal volume. Phase III clinical trials are currently ongoing.

BAN2401 
BAN2401, is a humanized mAb that selectively targets toxic soluble Aβ protofibrils, and the therapy is currently undergoing a phase 3 clinical trial which is expected to be completed in 2022.

Preventive trials
Failure of several drugs in Phase III clinical trials has led to AD prevention and early intervention for onset AD treatment endeavours. Passive anti-Aβ mAb treatment can be used for preventive attempts to modify AD progression before it causes extensive brain damage and symptoms. Trials using mAb treatment for patients positive for genetic risk factors, and elderly patients positive for indicators of AD are underway. This includes anti-AB treatment in Asymptomatic Alzheimer's Disease (A4), the Alzheimer's Prevention Initiative (API), and DIAN-TU.
The A4 study on older individuals who are positive for indicators of AD but are negative for genetic risk factors will test Solanezumab in Phase III Clinical Trials, as a follow up of previous Solanezumab studies.
DIAN-TU, launched in December 2012, focuses on young patients positive for genetic mutations that are risks for AD. This study uses Solanezumab and Gautenerumab. Gautenerumab, the first fully human MAB that preferentially interacts with oligomerized Aβ plaques in the brain, caused significant reduction in Aβ concentration in Phase I clinical trials, preventing plaque formation and concentration without altering plasma concentration of the brain. Phase II and III clinical trials are currently being conducted.

Therapy types

Radioimmunotherapy 
Radioimmunotherapy (RIT) involves the use of radioactively-conjugated murine antibodies against cellular antigens. Most research involves their application to lymphomas, as these are highly radio-sensitive malignancies. To limit radiation exposure, murine antibodies were chosen, as their high immunogenicity promotes rapid tumor clearance. Tositumomab is an example used for non-Hodgkin's lymphoma.

Antibody-directed enzyme prodrug therapy 
Antibody-directed enzyme prodrug therapy (ADEPT) involves the application of cancer-associated monoclonal antibodies that are linked to a drug-activating enzyme. Systemic administration of a non-toxic agent results in the antibody's conversion to a toxic drug, resulting in a cytotoxic effect that can be targeted at malignant cells. The clinical success of ADEPT treatments is limited.

Antibody-drug conjugates 
Antibody-drug conjugates (ADCs) are antibodies linked to one or more drug molecules. Typically when the ADC meets the target cell (e.g. a cancerous cell) the drug is released to kill it. Many ADCs are in clinical development.  a few have been approved.

Immunoliposome therapy 
Immunoliposomes are antibody-conjugated liposomes. Liposomes can carry drugs or therapeutic nucleotides and when conjugated with monoclonal antibodies, may be directed against malignant cells. Immunoliposomes have been successfully used in vivo to convey tumour-suppressing genes into tumours, using an antibody fragment against the human transferrin receptor. Tissue-specific gene delivery using immunoliposomes has been achieved in brain and breast cancer tissue.

Checkpoint therapy 
Checkpoint therapy uses antibodies and other techniques to circumvent the defenses that tumors use to suppress the immune system. Each defense is known as a checkpoint. Compound therapies combine antibodies to suppress multiple defensive layers. Known checkpoints include CTLA-4 targeted by ipilimumab, PD-1 targeted by nivolumab and pembrolizumab and the tumor microenvironment.

The tumor microenvironment (TME) features prevents the recruitment of T cells to the tumor. Ways include chemokine CCL2 nitration, which traps T cells in the stroma. Tumor vasculature helps tumors preferentially recruit other immune cells over T cells, in part through endothelial cell (EC)–specific expression of FasL, ETBR, and B7H3. Myelomonocytic and tumor cells can up-regulate expression of PD-L1, partly driven by hypoxic conditions and cytokine production, such as IFNβ. Aberrant metabolite production in the TME, such as the pathway regulation by IDO, can affect T cell functions directly and indirectly via cells such as Treg cells. CD8 cells can be suppressed by B cells regulation of TAM phenotypes. Cancer-associated fibroblasts (CAFs) have multiple TME functions, in part through extracellular matrix (ECM)–mediated T cell trapping and CXCL12-regulated T cell exclusion.

FDA-approved therapeutic antibodies

The first FDA-approved therapeutic monoclonal antibody was a murine IgG2a CD3 specific transplant rejection drug, OKT3 (also called muromonab), in 1986. This drug found use in solid organ transplant recipients who became steroid resistant. Hundreds of therapies are undergoing clinical trials. Most are concerned with immunological and oncological targets.

Tositumomab – Bexxar – 2003 – CD20

Mogamulizumab – Poteligeo – August 2018 – CCR4

Moxetumomab pasudotox – Lumoxiti – September 2018 – CD22

Cemiplimab – Libtayo – September 2018 – PD-1

Polatuzumab vedotin – Polivy – June 2019 – CD79B

The bispecific antibodies have yielded promising results in clinical trials. In April 2009, the bispecific antibody catumaxomab was approved in the European Union.

Economics
Since 2000, the therapeutic market for monoclonal antibodies has grown exponentially. In 2006, the “big 5” therapeutic antibodies on the market were bevacizumab, trastuzumab (both oncology), adalimumab, infliximab (both autoimmune and inflammatory disorders, ‘AIID’) and rituximab (oncology and AIID) accounted for 80% of revenues in 2006. In 2007, eight of the 20 best-selling biotechnology drugs in the U.S. are therapeutic monoclonal antibodies. This rapid growth in demand for monoclonal antibody production has been well accommodated by the industrialization of mAb manufacturing.

References

External links 
 Cancer Management Handbook: Principles of Oncologic Pharmacotherapy 

Immunology

Antiviral drugs

sl:Biološka zdravila